Dynactin subunit 3 is a protein that in humans is encoded by the DCTN3 gene.

This gene encodes the smallest subunit of dynactin, a macromolecular complex consisting of 10 subunits ranging in size from 22 to 150 kD. Dynactin binds to both microtubules and cytoplasmic dynein. It is involved in a diverse array of cellular functions, including ER-to-Golgi transport, the centripetal movement of lysosomes and endosomes, spindle formation, cytokinesis, chromosome movement, nuclear positioning, and axonogenesis. This subunit, like most other dynactin subunits, exists only as a part of the dynactin complex. It is primarily an alpha-helical protein with very little coiled coil, and binds directly to the largest subunit (p150) of dynactin. Alternative splicing of this gene generates 2 transcript variants.

References

Further reading